The Swiss Vapeur Parc is a miniature park in Le Bouveret, a village on Lac Léman, Switzerland. It was opened on June 6, 1989, by an International Festival of Steam (therefore steam trains). When the park opened its total surface area was 9000 m2 (2.2 acres), but the park expanded and as of 2007, the park covers a surface area of 17'000 m2 (or 4.2 acres). In 1989, the park possessed only 2 locomotives (one running on benzine and one on steam). As of 2007, the number of trains running on benzine has sextupled while the number of steam trains has increased to 9 trains. By March 31, 2007, the Park has had 2'126'000 visitors.

Every June the park is host to the International Steam Festival.

Image gallery

External links
The Official Website
Press Communique 2007

Tourist attractions in Valais
Amusement parks in Switzerland
1989 establishments in Switzerland
Buildings and structures in Valais
Miniature parks
Amusement parks opened in 1989
20th-century architecture in Switzerland